This is a list of notable female kickboxers. This list shows kickboxers and professional competitors of other martial arts such as bama-lethwei (burmese boxing), kickboxing, pradal serey (khmer boxing), sanshou (sanda), savate boxing and shoot boxing.

A 
 
 Bernise Alldis
 Anaëlle Angerville
 Patricia Apolot
 Zaza Sor. Aree
 Ruth Ashdown
 Azza Attoura
 Phayahong Ayothayafightgym

B 

 Jorina Baars
 Christine Bannon-Rodrigues
 Iman Barlow
 Lehize Hilal Benli
 Jemyma Betrian
 Ruqsana Begum
 Nili Block
 Anna Bogomazova
 Cecilia Brækhus
 Christi Brereton
 Cathy Brown
 Annalisa Bucci
 Julia Budd

C 

 Joanne Calderwood
 Bonnie Canino
 Gina Carano
 Graciela Casillas
 Parinya Charoenphol
 Jasminka Cive
 Sophia Crawford

D 

 Sarel de Jong
 Tessa De Kom
 Germaine de Randamie
 Amel Dehby
 Dakota Ditcheva
 Jessamyn Duke
 Zehra Doğan

E 

 Lisa Ellis
 Ilonka Elmont

F 

  Genah Fabian
 Stamp Fairtex
 Lara Fernandez
 Yeliz Findik
 Aurélie Froment
 Ania Fucz
 Emi Fujino

G 

 Mellony Geugjes
 Fredia Gibbs
 Elina Gismeeva
 Therese Gunnarsson
 Zoila Frausto Gurgel

H 

 Anissa Haddaoui
 Claire Haigh
 Regina Halmich
 Seo Hee Ham
 Felice Herrig
 Angela Hill
 Anne Line Hogstad
 Holly Holm
 Bec Hyatt

I 

 Mai Ichii
 Jill Idh
 Diana Lee Inosanto
 Mizuki Inoue
 Saori Ishioka
 Saya Ito

J 

 Joanna Jędrzejczyk
 Cristiane Justino

K 

 Mallaury Kalachnikoff
 Erika Kamimura
 Amanda Kelly
 Wang Kehan
 Denise Kielholtz
 Justine Kish
 Julie Kitchen
 Lorena Klijn
 Manazo Kobayashi
 Kotomi
 Karolina Kowalkiewicz
 Johanna Kruse
 Rena Kubota
 Naoko Kumagai

L 

 Daisy Lang
 Silvia La Notte
 Lizzie Largillière
 Ludivine Lasnier
  Farinaz Lari
  Andrea Lee
 Mimi Lesseos
 Josefine Lindgren Knutsson
 Su Jeong Lim
 Juliana Lima
 Loma Lookboonmee
 Kathy Long

M 

 Emilie Machut
 Anne Sophie Mathis
 Laëtitia Madjene
 Layla McCarter
 E Meidie
 Anissa Meksen
 Martine Michieletto
 Ayaka Miyauchi
 Koyuki Miyazaki
 Nevenka Mikulic
 Cristina Morales
 Kana Morimoto
 Sarah Moussadak
 Kathleen Murphy
 Serin Murray
 Mio Tsumura

N 

 Miriam Nakamoto
 Eva Naranjo
 Sakura Nomura

O 

 Geraldine O'Callaghan
 Sofia Olofsson
 Lena Ovchynnikova
 Hatice Ozyurt

P 

 Lucy Payne
 Dina "Dinamite" Pedro
 Jessica Penne
 Aline Pereira
 Gloria Peritore
 Cindy Perros
 Amy Pirnie
 Angélique Pitiot

R 

  Natascha Ragosina
 Fanny Ramos
 Caley Reece
 Elena Reid
 Lucia Rijker
 Bridgett Riley
 Panchan Rina
  Angela Rivera-Parr
 Alexis Rufus

S 

 Yulia Sachkov
  Asiye Ozlem Sahin
 Hulya Sahin
 Sabriye Şengül
   Antonina Shevchenko
   Valentina Shevchenko
 Sachiyo Shibata
 Cindy Silvestre
 Jeri Sitzes
 Grace Spicer
 Cristiana Stancu
 J.A. Steel
 Julija Stoliarenko
 Miyuu Sugawara

T 

 Chommanee Sor Taehiran
 Ai Takahashi
 Miho Takanashi
 Yoko Takahashi
 Jennifer Tate
 Hinata Terayama
 Christine Theiss
 Kim Townsend
 Nicole Trimmel
 Charmaine Tweet

U 

 Chantal Ughi
 Meryem Uslu

V 

 Jleana Valentino
 Ekaterina Vandaryeva
 Saskia van Rijswijk
 Tiffany van Soest
 Anke Van Gestel
 Kerry Vera
 Veronica Vernocchi
 Chiara Vincis
 Oksana Vozovic

W 

 Cong Wang
 Michelle Waterson
 Cheryl Wheeler
 Teresa Wintermyr

Y 

 Megumi Yabushita
 Mako Yamada
 Mei Yamaguchi
 Hiroko Yamanaka
 Kaitlin Young

See also

List of male kickboxers

 
kickboxers
kickboxers
female